The 2013 European Canoe Slalom Championships took place in Kraków, Poland between June 6 and 9, 2013 under the auspices of the European Canoe Association (ECA) at the Kraków-Kolna Canoe Slalom Course. It was the 14th edition and it was the second time that Kraków hosted the event after hosting it in 2008. The competitions were held over two days instead of three due to floods which forced the organizers to shorten the program. The qualification for individual events consisted of a single run instead of two and the semifinal runs were skipped. Therefore, the competitions were decided in two runs instead of four. The women's C1 team event was canceled completely.

Medal summary

Men's results

Canoe

Kayak

Women's results

Canoe

Kayak

Medal table

References

External links

 European Canoe Association

European Canoe Slalom Championships
European Canoe Slalom Championships
European Canoe Slalom Championships
Sports competitions in Kraków
Canoeing and kayaking competitions in Poland
International sports competitions hosted by Poland
June 2013 sports events in Europe
21st century in Kraków